Türkmengala is a city and capital of Türkmengala District, Mary Region, Turkmenistan.

Etymology
The name means "Turkmen fortress". Atanyyazow suggests that the settlement received this name in the 17th or 18th century due to the numerous battles between Turkmen tribes on the one hand and the Kajar (Kyzylbash) tribe on the other.

Transportation
Türkmengala is on the P-25 highway that connects Baýramaly and Ýolöten.

References

Populated places in Mary Region